Thomas Aikenhead (bapt. 28 March 1676 – 8 January 1697) was a Scottish student from Edinburgh, who was prosecuted and executed at the age of 20 on a charge of blasphemy under the Act against Blasphemy 1661 and Act against Blasphemy 1695. He was the last person in Great Britain to be executed for blasphemy. His execution occurred 85 years after the death of Edward Wightman (1612), the last person to be burned at the stake for heresy in England.

Early life 
Thomas Aikenhead was the son of James Aikenhead and Helen Ramsey. His father was a burgess of Edinburgh, as was his paternal grandfather (also named Thomas Aikenhead). His maternal grandfather was a clergyman. He was baptized on 28 March 1676, the fourth child and first son of the family. Of his three older sisters (Jonet, Katherine, and Margaret), at least one and possibly two died before he was born.

Indictment
During his studies at the University of Edinburgh, he engaged in discussions regarding religion with his friends and accounts from at least five of those friends formed the basis of indictment.

Aikenhead was indicted in December 1696. The indictment read:
That ... the prisoner had repeatedly maintained, in conversation, that theology was a rhapsody of ill-invented nonsense, patched up partly of the moral doctrines of philosophers, and partly of poetical fictions and extravagant chimeras: That he ridiculed the holy scriptures, calling the Old Testament Ezra's fables, in profane allusion to Esop's Fables; That he railed on Christ, saying, he had learned magick in Egypt, which enabled him to perform those pranks which were called miracles: That he called the New Testament the history of the imposter Christ; That he said Moses was the better artist and the better politician; and he preferred Muhammad to Christ: That the Holy Scriptures were stuffed with such madness, nonsense, and contradictions, that he admired the stupidity of the world in being so long deluded by them: That he rejected the mystery of the Trinity as unworthy of refutation; and scoffed at the incarnation of Christ.

Trial and sentence
The case was prosecuted by the Lord Advocate, Sir James Stewart, who demanded the death penalty in order to set an example to others who might otherwise express such opinions. On 24 December 1696, the jury found Aikenhead guilty of cursing and railing against God, denying the incarnation and the Trinity, and scoffing at the Scriptures.

He was sentenced to death by hanging. This was an extraordinary penalty, as the statute called for execution only upon the third conviction for this offence; first-time offenders were to be sack-clothed and imprisoned.

According to Aikenhead's entry in the Dictionary of Unitarian and Universalist Biography (written by Andrew Hill):
Aikenhead petitioned the Privy Council to consider his "deplorable circumstances and tender years". Also, he had forgotten to mention that he was also a first time offender. Two ministers and two Privy Councillors pleaded on his behalf, but to no avail. On 7 January, after another petition, the Privy Council ruled that they would not grant a reprieve unless the church interceded for him. The Church of Scotland’s General Assembly, sitting in Edinburgh at the time, urged "vigorous execution" to curb "the abounding of impiety and profanity in this land". Thus Aikenhead's sentence was confirmed.

Execution
On the morning of 8 January 1697, Aikenhead wrote to his friends that "it is a principle innate and co-natural to every man to have an insatiable inclination to the truth, and to seek for it as for hid treasure. . . So I proceeded until the more I thought thereon, the further I was from finding the verity I desired. . ." Aikenhead may have read this letter outside the Tolbooth, before making the long walk, under guard, to the gallows on the road between Edinburgh and Leith. He was said to have died Bible in hand, "with all the Marks of a true Penitent".

Thomas Babington Macaulay said of Aikenhead's death that "the preachers who were the poor boy's murderers crowded round him at the gallows, and... insulted heaven with prayers more blasphemous than anything he had uttered." Professor David S. Nash said that Aikenhead's execution was "a Calvinist providential moment".

Aikenhead was the last person hanged for blasphemy in Great Britain, although it remained a capital offence in Scotland until 1825.

In fiction
The case of Thomas Aikenhead provides the inspiration for Dilys Rose's novel Unspeakable (2017). Aikenhead features as a central character in Heather Richardson's novel Doubting Thomas (2017).

See also 
 I Am Thomas, a 2016 play based on Aikenhead
 John William Gott, prosecuted for blasphemy and jailed in 1922
 George Holyoake, convicted for blasphemy in a public lecture in 1842
 Scottish Secular Society#Aikenhead Award

Notes

References

Further reading 

 
 
  (Originated at a conference in 2004)

External links

Broadside account concerning trials and executions for 'Witchcraft, Adultery, Fornication, &c. &c John Muir, printer, Princes Street, Edinburgh, 1826; at National Library of Scotland
Thomas Aikenhead Commentary at pp. 5–8 (fol. 442–44) of Letter, Rev. Robert Wyllie to the Laird of Wishaw, 16 June 1697; at Proceedings of the Society of Antiquaries of Scotland 1876
Indytment of Thomas Aikenhead – Text of indictment at Wikisource

1676 births
1697 deaths
Criminals from Edinburgh
History of Christianity in Scotland
17th century in Edinburgh
People executed for blasphemy
People executed for heresy
17th-century executions by Scotland
People executed by the Kingdom of Scotland by hanging
Executed Scottish people
Alumni of the University of Edinburgh